Gabriel Lemme (born 13 June 1970) is an Argentine weightlifter. He competed in the men's lightweight event at the 1996 Summer Olympics.

References

1970 births
Living people
Argentine male weightlifters
Olympic weightlifters of Argentina
Weightlifters at the 1996 Summer Olympics
Place of birth missing (living people)
20th-century Argentine people